NerdTV is a technology TV show from PBS. NerdTV is aired, instead each episode is released as a MPEG-4 video file, freely downloadable and licensed under a Creative Commons license. Transcripts and audio-only versions of the released episodes are available as well.

The show features Robert X. Cringely interviewing famous and influential nerds. Each episode is about one hour and features a single guest from the world of technology. From September 6, 2005 to November 29, 2005, thirteen episodes comprising Season One were released on the Internet. Another thirteen episodes have been promised for Season Two, along with a more consistent release schedule and better quality video files.

Schedule

Episode highlights

NerdTV008 – Avram Miller
This episode is one of the first where the subject (Avram Miller) is not an entrepreneur, which is to say he didn't create a company that was successful, though he did facilitate many successful startup companies through his investment portfolio while at Intel. The show chronologically follows his career, including:
 Biotech (although the term didn't exist yet) experiences with brain-wave analysis.
 networked computer monitoring in the hospital environment in the mid-late 1960.
 starting & running a company in Israel at the end of the War of Attrition.
 working with Ken Olsen for Digital Equipment Corporation around the time of IBM's launch of the PC.
 to finally joining Intel and working with them to develop numerous new ideas and venture capitalist investments Intel Capital.

External links
NerdTV homepage
Robert X. Cringely article on NerdTV

2005 American television series debuts
2005 American television series endings
PBS original programming
American non-fiction web series
Documentary films about technology